Fides was the goddess of trust and good faith (bona fides) in Roman paganism. She was one of the original virtues to be considered an actual religious divinity.  Fides is everything that is required for "honour and credibility, from  fidelity  in  marriage, to  contractual  arrangements, and the obligation soldiers owed to Rome." Fides also means reliability, "reliability between two parties, which is always reciprocal." and "bedrock of relations between people and their communities", and then it was turned into a Roman deity and from which we gain the English word, 'fidelity'. 

The Roman deity may have an example in Regulus "who refuses to save  himself  at  the  expense  of  the  Republic. Regulus  defied  his  own  best  interests  for those of his country. In this act alone, he acted with fides."

Temple
Her temple, the Temple of Fides on the Capitoline Hill, was also called the Fides Publica and Fides Publica Populi Romani. Dedicated by Aulus Atilius Calatinus, and restored by M. Aemilius Scaurus, the structure was surrounded by a display of bronze tables of laws and treaties, and was occasionally used for Senate meetings.

Worship and depiction
She was also worshipped under the name Fides Publica Populi Romani ("Public (or Common) Trust of the Roman People"). She is represented as a young woman crowned with an olive or laurel wreath, holding in her hand a turtle-dove, fruits or grain, or a military ensign. She wears a white veil. 

Traditionally Rome's second king, Numa Pompilius, was said to have instituted a yearly ceremony devoted to Fides Publica in which the major priests (the three flamines maiores—Dialis, Martialis, and Quirinalis) were to be borne to her temple in a covered arched chariot drawn by two horses on 1 October. There they should conduct her services with their heads covered and right hands wrapped up to the fingers to indicate absolute devotion to her and to symbolise trust.

See also
 Harpocrates, Greek god of silence, secrets and confidentiality.  
 Semo Sancus

References

Roman goddesses
Personifications in Roman mythology